Sayaka Murata (村田沙耶香 Murata Sayaka; born August 14, 1979) is a Japanese writer. She has won the Gunzo Prize for New Writers, the Mishima Yukio Prize, the Noma Literary New Face Prize, and the Akutagawa Prize.

Biography 
Murata was born in Inzai, Chiba Prefecture, Japan, in 1979. As a child, she often read science fiction and mystery novels borrowed from her brother and mother, and her mother bought her a word processor after she attempted to write a novel by hand in the fourth grade of elementary school. After Murata completed middle school in Inzai, her family moved to Tokyo, where she graduated from Kashiwa High School (attached to Nishogakusha University) and attended Tamagawa University. 

Her first novel, Jyunyū (Breastfeeding), won the 2003 Gunzo Prize for New Writers. In 2013 she won the Mishima Yukio Prize for Shiro-iro no machi no, sono hone no taion no (Of Bones, Of Body Heat, Of Whitening City), and in 2014 the Special Prize of the Sense of Gender Award. In 2016 her 10th novel, Konbini ningen (Convenience Store Person), won the prestigious Akutagawa Prize, and she was named one of Vogue Japan's Women of the Year. Konbini ningen has sold over 1.5 million copies in Japan and in 2018 it became her first book to be translated into English, under the title Convenience Store Woman. It has been translated into more than 30 languages.

Murata worked part-time as a convenience store clerk in Tokyo for eighteen years until 2017.

Writing style 
Murata's writing explores the different consequences of nonconformity in society for men and women, particularly with regard to gender roles, parenthood, and sex. Many of the themes and character backstories in her writing come from her daily observations as a part-time convenience store worker. Societal acceptance of sexlessness in various forms, including asexuality, voluntary and involuntary celibacy, especially within marriage, recurs as a theme in several of her works, such as the novels Shōmetsu sekai (Dwindling World) and Konbini ningen (Convenience Store Person), and the short story "A Clean Marriage." Murata is also known for her frank depictions of adolescent sexuality in work such as Gin iro no uta (Silver Song) and Shiro-iro no machi no, sono hone no taion no (Of Bones, of Body Heat, of Whitening City). In Satsujin shussan she depicts a future society which may be seen as dystopic for the use of Reproduction Technologies and the strange system called Birth-Murder System.

Themes

Challenging taboos 
Murata often places challenging taboos at the forefront of her most popular works. The title Earthlings focuses on an 11-year-old girl named Natsuki, with her boyfriend and cousin, Yuu, who believes themselves to be aliens due to their tumultuous relationship with their family. The story quickly develops into a harsh tale containing themes of "sexual abuse, murder, and cannibalism." Murata states on challenging taboos: "For example, murder is said to be taboo, but then why is it considered acceptable if it’s legitimate self-defense or capital punishment? I sensed the ambiguity in my childish mind. And I felt a physical repulsion and fear inside me toward incest and cannibalism, although I didn’t know why they were forbidden. I wondered where those emotions came from.” Murata believes that the more she writes about the questioning of these taboos, the closer she will come to the "real truth of things."

Conformity 
The topic of conformity is common in Japanese literature and culture, and Murata frequently questions its validity, especially in Convenience Store Woman. Conformity is often placed at the heart of Japanese culture, a notion that Murata frequently explores within her works. In this work, Keiko, the main heroine, finds herself trying to escape from reality's expectations of marrying and choosing a traditional career. Keiko eventually finds that her convenience store job is her only way to feel in touch with society, a "normal cog in society."

Asexuality 
Many of Murata's main heroines find themselves in asexual relationships, such as Natsuki in Earthling and Keiko in Convenience Store Woman.  Asexuality is a theme that coincides with questioning the standards society typically expects from citizens, a notion that Murata explores frequently. The asexuality prevalent in Murata's works can also be attributed to Japan's rising aversion towards sex.

Global warming and climate change 
Murata published a short story within the anthology titled Tales of Two Planets: Stories of Climate Change detailing a dystopian Japanese society built upon ranks given to humans based upon the likelihood that they survive until they're 65 with anyone falling below a specific rank becoming "feral." The short story titled Survival detailed the accounts of the world if global warming was left unattended, with torrential rain showers becoming commonplace and the remaining animals of the world only including humans, cockroaches, and cats. The increased likelihood of precipitation is supported heavily as well as the likelihood of cockroaches remaining as the Earth's only surviving species if climate change was left unaddressed.

Recognition

Bibliography

Books in Japanese
 Junyū (Breastfeeding) Kodansha, 2005, 
 Gin'iro no uta (Silver Song), Shinchosha, 2009, 
 Mausu (Mouse), Kodansha, 2008, 
 Hoshi ga sū mizu (Water for the Stars), Kodansha, 2010, 
 Hakobune (Ark), Shueisha, 2011, 
 Shiro-iro no machi no, sono hone no taion no (Of Bones, Of Body Heat, Of Whitening City), Asahi Shimbun, 2012, 
 Tadaima tobira, Shinchosha, 2012,  
 Satsujin shussan (The Murder Births), Kodansha, 2014, 
 Shōmetsu sekai (Dwindling World), Kawade Shobo Shinsha, 2015, 
 Konbini ningen (Convenience Store Person), Bungeishunju, 2016, 
 Chikyū seijin (Earthlings), Shinchosa 2018, 
 Seimeishiki (Life Ceremony), Kawade Shobo Shinsha 2019,

Books in English
 Convenience Store Woman, English translation of Konbini ningen by Ginny Tapley Takemori, Grove Atlantic, 2018, 
 Earthlings, English translation by Ginny Tapley Takemori, Grove Atlantic, 2020, .
 Life Ceremony: Stories, English translation by Ginny Tapley Takemori, Grove Atlantic, 2022, .

Short stories and other works in English 
A Clean Marriage (short story), English translation by Ginny Tapley Takemori, Granta 127: Japan, 2014.
A First-Rate Material (short story), English translation by Ginny Tapley Takemori, Freeman's: The Future of New Writing, 2017, .
Chameleon (photoessay with Tomoko Sawada), English translation by Ginny Tapley Takemori, Granta 144: Art & Photography, 2018.
The Future of Sex Lives in All of Us (article), English translation by Ginny Tapley Takemori,The New York Times, 2019.
 Survival (short story), English translation by Ginny Tapley Takemori, Penguin Books, Tales of Two Planets: Stories of Climate Change and Inequality in a World Divided, 2020, .
 Faith (short story), English translation by Ginny Tapley Takemori, Granta: The Online Edition, 2020.
 Final Days (short story), English translation by Ginny Tapley Takemori, Freeman's: Change, 2021, .
 A Summer Night's Kiss (short story), English translation by Ginny Tapley Takemori, Astra: Ecstasy, 2022.

References

External links 
 
 
 

1979 births
Living people
People from Inzai
21st-century Japanese novelists
Akutagawa Prize winners
Japanese women novelists
21st-century Japanese women writers